Kottakuppam is a Municipality at Viluppuram district in the state of Tamil Nadu, India.

Adjacent communities

References

Cities and towns in Viluppuram district